ČSA Flight 511 may refer to:

 ČSA Flight 511 (March 1961)
 ČSA Flight 511 (July 1961)

Flight number disambiguation pages